M.I.A.: Mission in Asia (Russian: Peacemaker) is a first-person shooter video game developed by Russian developer Burut Creative Team and published by Game Factory Interactive and Russobit-M. The game is set in 2007 in fictional countries of republic of Primoria and Slavia republic. It tells the story of Russian Armed Forces defending Slavia from Primorian militarists. It was released for Microsoft Windows on September 25, 2009, in Russia and on March 27, 2011, in North America.

Background story
After the breakup of the Soviet Union the Slavia republic that earlier was autonomy within Primoria, desired more independence. But Slavia people' aspiration met the misunderstanding from the nationalistic Primoria leadership. This misunderstanding soon turned into the military confrontation. The bloody conflict took many lives, but soon it was negated by the combined peacekeeping efforts of Russia and world community. Hostile sides were parted and the peacekeeping contingent of Russian forces took its place between them, preserving the peace for many years. After some time the newly elected president of Primoria, who came to power with the cries of territorial integrity restoration, decided to return rebellious Slavia under his control at all accounts. After a long period of fomenting tension, the president of Primoria gave an order to attack Maklock, the capital of Slavia. But on the way of Primorain militarists there still was a contingent of Russian peacekeepers.

Reception 
Absolute Games, a Russian video game website, gave the game a 33%. The reviewer criticized the game's plot and called it an "ordinary shooter."

References 

2011 video games
Video games developed in Russia
Windows games
Windows-only games
First-person shooters